Archibald Jacob Gumede (1914–1998) was a South African anti-apartheid activist, lawyer and politician. Gumede was born in Pietermaritzburg  to Josiah Tshangana Gumede, an early African National Congress leader. Archie Gumede led the Natal delegates at the 1955 Congress of the People in Kliptown during which the Freedom Charter was written. He was later an attorney and practiced in Pietermaritzburg. He was a leader in the United Democratic Front, a broad based coalition of groups seeking to end apartheid. Following the end of apartheid in 1994, Gumede became a member of the National Assembly of South Africa before dying in office in 1998.

References

1914 births
1998 deaths
People from Pietermaritzburg
Zulu people
African National Congress politicians
Members of the National Assembly of South Africa
Anti-apartheid activists
20th-century South African lawyers
Members of the Order of Luthuli